Hans Christian Andersen, also known as Paramount Pictures Presents Hans Christian Andersen and known in Japan as , is a Japanese anime anthology series based on the legendary stories of Hans Christian Andersen which aired on Fuji TV from January 3 to December 26, 1971. It consists of 52 episodes and was produced by Mushi Production and Zuiyo Enterprise.

Third entry in the Calpis Comic Theater, a precursor of the World Masterpiece Theater series. Zuiyo Enterprise, would split in 1975 into Nippon Animation Company, Ltd. (which employed some of the anime's production staff and continued with the World Masterpiece Theater franchise) and Zuiyo Company, Ltd., which retained the rights of the series along with Mushi Production.

Premise
The series has been broadcast three years after The World of Hans Christian Andersen (Anderusen Monogatari, 1968), an eponymous and thematically similar feature length movie produced by Toei Animation. The film and the series also have in common composer Seiichirō Uno, lyricist Hisashi Inoue, screenplay writer Morihisa Yamamoto and voice actress Eiko Masuyama.

In the TV series, some Andersen tales were each told in one episode, while others were told over several episodes. For a total of 31 storylines spanning 52 episodes.

Two pixies were used as a framing device (a gimmick later reused in Grimm's Fairy Tale Classics). The many different staff members were encouraged to vary their styles, often taking liberties. Several episodes were serious and dramatic, others light-hearted.

In English-speaking countries the series was released in the 1970s by Paramount Television under the title Hans Christian Andersen. 
ATLAB Australia was hired to dub the anime. The English adaptation by Noel Judd kept the original jazz-rock Japanese musical score, while often altering some character names and dialogues, sometimes in order to change overly sad endings (as in episode 5). Episodes from the English dub are currently extremely difficult to find.

The English adaptation of the series also served as a basis for dubs that aired in other countries outside Japan during the 1980s, such as Italy (in Syndacation), Germany (Sat.1 and Kabel.1), Catalonia (TV3), Bulgaria (BT1), Mexico (XEQ-TV Canal 9), Greece (ERT and ET3), Turkey (TRT) and in the Middle East (Kuwait Television).

Synopsis
In order to sign up to the University of the Fairy Land, it's necessary to collect 101 magic cards that appear out of nowhere when a good deed is performed. The pixies Bubbles and Bingo (Candy and Zukko in Japanese), have the opportunity to appear in the world of Andersen's fairy tales to try to modify the endings for the better: they will therefore try to intervene in the plots of fairy tales to change the course, but without much success.

Cast and characters
Source:
Similar in appearance to a pig, she has thick blonde hair, a tail of the same color and wears a burgundy bodysuit. Masuyama also voiced Anna, the little match girl in the last episode. 
He has brown curly hair, a tail of the same color and he's completely naked.
  Minori Matsushima – Ugly Duckling (eps. 1–2), Rudy (eps. 38–40), Svane (ep. 48)
  Ranko Mizuki – Mother Duck (eps. 1–2)
  Michiko Hirai – Ida (ep. 3), Ming Ming (eps. 11–12), Betty Ball (ep. 20), Helga (eps. 22–23), Princess B (ep. 22), Lara (ep. 30), Little Mermaid Aqua (eps. 31–33), Laura (ep.44), Marte (ep. 48), Evil Snow Queen (eps. 50–51), Anna's Mother (ep. 52)
  Yoshiko Yamamoto – Tin Soldier (ep. 4), Mouse (ep. 6), Ketty/Karen (eps. 42–43)
  Reiko Muto – Mother (ep. 5) Psyche/Cassandra (ep. 49)
  Kei Tomiyama – Tom (ep. 6), Fisherman Wong (eps. 11–12), Swallow (eps. 9–10)
  Kosei Tomita – Sultan (ep. 6), Emperor of China (eps. 11–12), Emperor (ep. 37), God (ep. 44)
  Yoko Kuri – Thumbelina (eps. 7–10)
  Natsuko Kawaji – Johanna/Lisa, Thumbelina's Mother (eps. 7–10)
  Junko Hori – Witch (eps. 7–10)
  Ichiro Nagai – Kuppe (eps. 7–10)
  Terue Nunami – Lady Mouse (eps. 9–10), Sea Witch (ep. 32), Princess No. 3 (eps. 31–33)
  Junpei Takiguchi – Mole (eps. 9–10)
  Hiroko Maruyama – Flower Prince (ep. 10)
  Yoshiko Ohta – Shepherdess Ellen (eps. 13–14), Young Ole (ep. 24)
  Sumiko Shirakawa – Chimney Sweep Chris (ep. 13–14), Peter/Johann (eps. 27–29), Carl (eps. 42–43)
  Mahito Tsujimura – Satyr (eps. 13–14), Hans/Larson (eps. 42–43)
  Koji Yada – Chen, Ellen's Grandfather/Stepfather (eps. 13–14), Viking King (ep. 21–23)
  Masako Nozawa – Marco (ep. 15), Paul (ep. 30)
  Kimie Nakajima – Woman (ep. 15)
  Kinto Tamura – Painter Angelo (ep. 15), Father (ep. 18), Sea Lion (eps. 31, 33), (ep. 37)
  Kiyoshi Komiyama – Hans (eps. 16-17), Swineherd Prince (ep. 34)
  Taichiro Hirokawa –  Capo Capo (ep. 19), Ib (eps. 35–36)
  Nobuyo Oyama – Top (ep. 20)
  Ushio Shima – (eps. 21-23)
  Masato Tsujii – Marsh King (eps. 21-23)
  Haruko Kitahama – Cassandra/Selima (eps. 21–23)
  Kazuko Makino – Viking's Wife (eps. 21-23), Sister A (ep. 22)
  Makio Inoue – Prince Arsid (ep. 23), Travelling Companion (eps. 27–29)
  Michiko Nomura – Ilze (ep. 24), Gerda (eps. 50–51)
  Toshiya Ueda – Ole the Dream-god (ep. 24)
  Keiko Tomochika – Maru Maru (ep. 24), Princess Milene/Frida (ep. 33)
  Sachiko Chijimatsu – Mary/Lily (ep. 27–29), Princess No. 2, 4 (eps. 31–33), (ep. 41)
  Masashi Amenomori – Circus Owner (eps. 27–28), Anna's Father (ep. 52)
  Akio Nojima – Prince (eps. 31–33)
  Osamu Saka – King Neptune (eps. 31–32)
  Kineko Nakamura – Nanny/Grandmother (eps. 31–33)
  Itoko Kikuchi – Princess No. 1, 5 (eps. 31–33)
  Yoshiko Matsuo – Maria (ep. 34), Eliza (eps. 45–47)
  Keiko Yamamoto – Ib as a Child (eps. 35–36), Peter (ep. 44)
  Hiroko Suzuki – Christina (eps. 35–36)
  Kinya Aikawa – (ep. 37),  (ep. 41)
  Shinsuke Chikaishi – (ep. 41)
  Junji Chiba – Jeppe, Ib's Father (eps. 35–36), Storyteller (ep. 49)
  Noriko Ohara – Ferone the Ice Maiden (eps. 38–40)
  Miyoko Aso – Ferone's Nanny/Vertigo (eps. 38–40)
  Masako Ebisu – Babette (eps. 38–40)
  Ryusuke Shiomi – Babette's Father (eps. 38–40)
  Koichi Kitamura – Carl's Father (eps. 42–43)
  Toshiko Maeda – Carl's Mother (eps. 42–43)
  Gentarō Inoue – Johann/Andy (eps. 42–43), King Frederick (eps. 46–47)
  Kohei Miyauchi – Eliza's Father (eps. 45–47)
  Kazue Takahashi – Evil Queen Carla (eps. 45–47), Kirt/Kirk (ep. 49)
  Shingo Kanemoto – Bad Priest (ep. 47)
  Yonehiko Kitagawa – (ep. 49)

Additional English voices
 Barbara Frawley
 Beryl Marshall
 Derani Scarr
 Jane Harders
 Jinx Lootens
 Noel Judd
 Phillip Hinton
 Robin Stewart
 Roy Hartley

Episodes

Music
All songs in the series are composed and arranged by Seiichirō Uno, and written together with Hisashi Inoue and Morihisa Yamamoto.

Opening theme

"Mr. Andersen" (ミスターアンデルセン) by Taeko Sakurai with Young Fresh

Ending theme

1) "Candy's song" (キャンティのうた, Kyandī no Uta) by Eiko Masuyama with Young Fresh (eps. 1–2, 5 and 6–52 in even-numbered episodes)

2) "Zukko's song" (ズッコのうた, Zukko no Uta) by Yasuo Yamada with Young Fresh (eps. 3–4 and 7–51 in odd-numbered episodes)

Releases
The series has been released both on VHS and DVD in Japan.

In 2005, Nippon Columbia released the entire series on DVD, celebrating Andersen's 200th birth anniversary.
A selection of episodes (in no particular order) was first released in January, 2005, as 5 single DVDs: "The Ugly Duckling", "The Little Mermaid", "The Red Shoes", "The Wild Swans" and "The Little Match Girl" along with "The Snow Queen".

The DVD-BOX was released in 3 volumes from March of the same year. (BOX 1 as the above-mentioned 5-disc set on March 23, 2005; BOX 2 as a 4-disc set on June 29, 2005, and BOX 3 as a 5-disc set on September 28, 2005).

On December 17, 2008, "Complete BOX", a set of all 14 volumes, was also released. Due to the release method mentioned above, the episodes order of each volume doesn't always match the actual broadcasting order.

The original soundtrack album by Seiichirō Uno was also re-issued as a 2-disc CD, containing also songs not used in the series.

With the exception of a 5-episode DVD issued in Germany, the series has never been released on home-video abroad.

International titles
Andersen Stories (Literal English)
Hans Christian Andersen (English)
Paramount Pictures Presents Hans Christian Andersen (Alternative English)
Le fiabe di Andersen (Italian)
Pixi in Wolkenkuckucksheim (German)
Las fábulas de Hans Christian Andersen (Spanish)
Τα Παραμύθια του Άντερσεν (Greek)
لمياء وتابعها شيكو (Arabic)
アンデルセン物語 (Japanese)
Andersen Masalları (Turkish)

References

External links
 
 
Andersen Monogatari at the Big Cartoon DataBase
Andersen Monogatari at Fernsehserien.de
Official website

Animation anthology series
1971 anime television series debuts
Fuji TV original programming
World Masterpiece Theater series
Television shows based on fairy tales
Anime and manga based on fairy tales
Television shows based on works by Hans Christian Andersen
Adventure anime and manga
Fantasy anime and manga
Children's manga